Five Hundred Pounds is an album by Canadian rock band Big Sugar, released in 1993 on Hypnotic Records.

Based on Big Sugar's burgeoning reputation as a live band, the album sold 10,000 copies solely by word of mouth before it garnered any significant radio airplay.

In 1995 the album was released in the United States as 500 Pounds, with an alternate album cover and an alternate track listing.

Track listing
 "Ride Like Hell" – 4:48
 "Standing Around Crying" – 3:56
 "I'm a Ram" – 3:31
 "Sugar in My Coffee" – 5:12
 "All Over Now" – 3:41
 "AAA Aardvark Hotel" – 2:13
 "How Many Times" – 4:05
 "Deliver Me" – 4:16
 "Still Waitin'" – 5:31
 "Wild Ox Moan" – 5:41
 "Ride On" – 6:49

References

1993 albums
Big Sugar albums